The blue-and-yellow tanager (Rauenia bonariensis) is a species of bird in the tanager family Thraupidae.

It is found in Argentina, Uruguay, Brazil, Paraguay, Bolivia, extreme northern border Chile, and Andean Peru and Ecuador. Some southern region birds migrate northeastwards in the austral winter into eastern Bolivia and northeastern Argentina; also Paraguay where the birds are only migratory non-breeding residents.

Its natural habitats are subtropical or tropical dry forest, subtropical or tropical moist lowland forest, subtropical or tropical moist montane forest, subtropical or tropical high-altitude shrubland, and heavily degraded former forest.

This species was formerly placed in the genus Thraupis. It was moved to Pipraeidea based on the results of a molecular phylogenetic study published in 2014. It was moved to Rauenia based on the study published in 2020. It is monotypic in that genus.

Gallery

References

External links
 Photos, videos and observations at Cornell Lab of Ornithologys Birds of the World
Stamps (for Argentina, Paraguay, Uruguay) – with ~RangeMap
 
Photo-High Res; Article  incatrail-Peru – "Birds of Machu-Picchu"

blue-and-yellow tanager
Birds of Bolivia
Birds of Argentina
Birds of Uruguay
Birds of Brazil
Birds of the South Region
blue-and-yellow tanager
blue-and-yellow tanager
Taxonomy articles created by Polbot
Taxobox binomials not recognized by IUCN